So Long, au Revoir is the first Japanese language studio album by South Korean rock band F.T. Island, released on 16 December 2009 by indie label AI Entertainment. The first single, The One, released much earlier, debuted at 9th place on the Oricon daily chart. This was the last album recorded with Oh Won-bin, who shortly thereafter left the band.

Track list

References

F.T. Island albums
Japanese-language albums
2009 albums